Tettenhall College is a co-educational private day and boarding school located in the Wolverhampton suburb of Tettenhall in England.

History
The college was founded in 1863 by a group of prominent local businessmen and industrialists, most of who were associated with the Queen Street Congregational Church. Tettenhall Towers was built by Wolverhampton industrialist Colonel Thomas Thorneycroft as a house for him and his family. The Towers Theatre was originally a ballroom and has springs under the floor to make it a better dancing surface. The stage was built later on for the school when it started. The school was sold by the last member of the Thorneycroft family in 1942. The college's lower school building was completed in September 2000 and the science department in 2007.

Boarding
There are two boarding houses: Thorneycroft (girls) and School House (boys). Less than 15% of pupils board. Most boarders are international pupils or children of military personnel.

Notable former pupils

Nigel Bennett - Actor, director, author
William Bidlake - Arts & Crafts architect (1861-1938)
Tom Fell - Professional Cricketer
Richard Dalziel Graham FRSE - educator and author
Professor Sir Arthur Harden FRS - won Nobel Prize for Chemistry in 1929 (1865-1940)
Rt. Hon. Anthony Hughes, Lord Hughes of Ombersley - Judge (born 1948)
Nicholas Jones - former BBC Political Correspondent
Jeremy Middleton - Vice Chairman of the Conservative Party and businessman.
Steven Morris (journalist) The Guardian 
 Charles Pearce - calligrapher
Peter Radford - Bronze Medal winner in the 100m and 4 × 100 m relay in Rome Olympic Games in 1960
Mark Speight - television presenter
David Sumberg - MEP, former MP (born 1941)
George Rennie Thorne - Liberal MP for Wolverhampton East 1908 - 1929, former Mayor and Alderman of Wolverhampton (1853 - 1934)
 Brigadier Sir Edgar "Bill" Williams (1912–1995) – academic and soldier

References

Whild, Simon (2009). The History of Tettenhall College. Matador.

External links

Tettenhall College website
Profile at the ISC website
ISI Inspection Reports

Private schools in Wolverhampton
Boarding schools in the West Midlands (county)
Member schools of the Independent Schools Association (UK)